Miacidae ("small points") is a former paraphyletic family of extinct primitive placental mammals that lived in North America, Europe and Asia during the Paleocene and Eocene epochs, about 65-33,9 million years ago. These mammals were basal to order Carnivora, the crown-group within the Carnivoraformes.

Miacids are thought to have evolved into the modern carnivorous mammals of the order Carnivora. They were small carnivores, superficially marten-like or civet-like with long, lithe bodies and long tails. Some species were arboreal, while others lived on the ground.

They probably fed on invertebrates, lizards, birds, and smaller mammals like shrews and opossums. Their teeth and skulls show that the miacids were less developed than modern carnivorans. They had carnivoran-type carnassials, but lacked fully ossified auditory bullae (rounded protrusions).

Classification

History of classification
Miacidae as traditionally conceived is not a monophyletic group; it is a paraphyletic array of stem taxa. Traditionally, Miacidae and Viverravidae had been classified in a superfamily, Miacoidea. Today, Carnivora and Miacoidea are grouped together in the crown-clade Carnivoramorpha, and the Miacoidea are regarded as basal carnivoramorphs. Some species of the genus Miacis are closely related to the order Carnivora, but only the species Miacis australis and Miacis cognitus are a true carnivorans, as they are classified in the family Amphicyonidae within Caniformia.

The divergence of carnivorans from miacids is now inferred to have occurred in the middle-Eocene (ca. 42 million years ago). Traditionally, the Viverravidae (viverravids) had been thought to be the earliest carnivorans, with fossil records first appearing in the Paleocene of North America about 66 million years ago, but recent cranial morphology evidence now places them outside the order Carnivora. Later authorities disagreed, and propose that the viverravids arose in North America 66-60 million years ago, spread to Asia then later to Europe, and were the first carnivorans and possessed the first true pair of carnassial teeth.

It has been proposed that miacids arose in North America and Europe 60-50 million years ago then later spread to Asia. Like the earlier viverravids, they possessed a true pair of carnassial teeth and therefore are related to order Carnivora. They also possessed a full set of cheek teeth, were weasel to small fox sized, and lived in forests. All modern carnivorans arose from them.

Taxonomy
 Family: †Miacidae 
 Genus: †Chailicyon 
 Genus: †Eogale 
 Genus: †Gracilocyon 
 Genus: †Harpalodon 
 Genus: †Lycarion 
 Genus: †Messelogale 
 Genus: †Miacis 
 Genus: †Miocyon 
 Genus: †Neovulpavus 
 Genus: †Oodectes 
 Genus: †Palaearctonyx 
 Genus: †Paramiacis 
 Genus: †Paroodectes 
 Genus: †Procynodictis 
 Genus: †Prodaphaenus 
 Genus: †Quercygale 
 Genus: †Simamphicyon 
 Genus: †Tapocyon 
 Genus: †Uintacyon 
 Genus: †Vassacyon 
 Genus: †Vulpavus 
 Genus: †Xinyuictis 
 Genus: †Zodiocyon

Phylogeny

References

Obsolete mammal taxa